Cortandone is a comune (municipality) in the Province of Asti in the Italian region Piedmont, located about  southeast of Turin and about  northwest of Asti.

Cortandone borders the following municipalities: Camerano Casasco, Cinaglio, Cortazzone, Maretto, and Monale.

Demographic evolution

References

Cities and towns in Piedmont